Morris Slavin (1913–2006) was a scholar of the French Revolution, a Marxist historian, and an early American Trotskyist activist between the 1930s and 1950s. Slavin was born in Kiev but lived primarily in Youngstown, Ohio.  Slavin taught for many years at Youngstown State University and his books made a significant contribution to the understanding of the French Revolution in the "history from below" style established by Albert Soboul.

Books
 The French Revolution in Miniature: Section Droits-de-L'Homme, 1789-1795, Princeton, 1984.
 The Making of an Insurrection: Parisian Sections and the Gironde, Harvard, 1986.
 The Hébertistes to the Guillotine: Anatomy of a "Conspiracy" in Revolutionary France, Louisiana State, 1994. 
 The Left and the French Revolution, Humanities, 1995.

Collections
 Bourgeois, Sans-Culottes, and Other Frenchmen, ed. with Agnes M. Smith, Wilfrid Laurier University, 1981.
 Reflections at the End of a Century, ed. with Louis Pastouras, Youngstown State, 2002.

Essays
 "The Heroic Individual and His Milieu," in Debating Marx, ed. Louis Pastouras, EmText, 1994.
 "Robespierre and the Insurrection of 31 May - 2 June 1793," in Robespierre, ed. Colin Haydon and William Doyle, Cambridge University Press, 1999.

Publications Available Online
 Review of book on Annales School, 1991
 Review-essay on studies of Lenin and Bolshevism, 1996
 Review of Russian Trotskyist memoir, 1997
 Review of book on French Revolution in Russian intellectual life, 1997

References

Further reading
 Boris Blick and Louis Pastouras, eds., Rebels Against the Old Order: Essays in Honor of Morris Slavin, Youngstown State, 1994.

External links
Against the Current
Perspectives (American Historical Association)

1913 births
2006 deaths
Soviet emigrants to the United States
American Trotskyists
Historians of the French Revolution
20th-century American historians
American Marxist historians
American male non-fiction writers
Writers from Youngstown, Ohio
Historians from Ohio